The Hiro H2H, or "Navy Type 89 Flying boat", was a Japanese patrol flying boat of the 1930s.  Designed and built by the Hiro Naval Arsenal, it was a twin-engined biplane that was operated by the Imperial Japanese Navy.

Design and development
In 1929, the Imperial Japanese Navy purchased a single example of the British Supermarine Southampton II metal-hulled flying boat, and after evaluation, it was passed onto the Hiro Naval Arsenal (who designed the wooden Hiro H1H flying boat based on the Felixstowe F.5), to study its advanced metal hull structure. Following this study, Hiro designed a new flying boat, closely resembling the Southampton.

The new aircraft was a twin-engined biplane, with an all-metal hull, and fabric covered metal wing and tail structures. It was powered by two Hiro Type 14 water-cooled 12-cylinders W engines. The first prototype was completed in 1930, and following successful testing was ordered into production, with 13 aircraft being built by Hiro and a further four by Aichi. Later aircraft were powered by more powerful (600-750 hp (448-560 kW)) Hiro Type 90 engines.

Operational history
It entered service in 1932 as the Type 89 Flying boat, with the short designation H2H1.  Type 89 Flying Boats entered service in time for the Shanghai Incident, and along with Hiro's earlier H1H, served in front line service until the early years of the Second Sino-Japanese War.

Specifications (Early version)

See also

References

Notes

Bibliography

Andrews, C.F. and Morgan, E.B. Supermarine Aircraft since 1914. London:Putnam, 1987. .
Mikesh, Robert C. and Abe, Shorzoe. Japanese Aircraft 1910-1941. London:Putnam, 1990. .

External links
Hiro H2H 

1930s Japanese patrol aircraft
Flying boats
H2H
Biplanes
Aircraft first flown in 1930
Twin piston-engined tractor aircraft